Seo Hun-gyo (born 16 June 1944) is a South Korean wrestler. He competed in the men's Greco-Roman 70 kg at the 1968 Summer Olympics.

References

External links
 

1944 births
Living people
South Korean male sport wrestlers
Olympic wrestlers of South Korea
Wrestlers at the 1968 Summer Olympics
Sportspeople from Busan
20th-century South Korean people